Rozellville is an unincorporated community located in the town of Day, Marathon County, Wisconsin, United States. Located at the intersection of County Road M and County Road C, approximately 3 miles East of State Highway 97.

Images

References

Unincorporated communities in Marathon County, Wisconsin
Unincorporated communities in Wisconsin